Vanak Rural District is a rural district (dehestan) in the Central District of Semirom County, Isfahan Province, Iran. At the 2006 census, its population was 558, in 120 families.  The rural district has 3 villages.

References 

Rural Districts of Isfahan Province
Semirom County